Kent Amos Jordan (born October 24, 1957) is a United States circuit judge of the United States Court of Appeals for the Third Circuit. He was previously a United States district judge of the United States District Court for the District of Delaware from 2002 to 2006.

Early life
Jordan was born in West Point, New York, on October 24, 1957. Jordan is a member of the Church of Jesus Christ of Latter-day Saints. He served a mission in Japan.

Education and clerkship 
Jordan completed his undergraduate studies at Brigham Young University in 1981 with a Bachelor of Arts degree (majoring in economics), and received his Juris Doctor from Georgetown University Law Center in 1984.  Jordan clerked for Judge James L. Latchum on the United States District Court for the District of Delaware from 1984 to 1985.

Legal background 

Jordan was in private practice in Delaware from 1985 to 1987 and again from 1992 to 1997. In between, from 1987 to 1992, he worked for the United States Department of Justice as an Assistant United States Attorney for the District of Delaware. He also taught at the Widener University School of Law from 1995 to 1996 as an adjunct professor. He was vice president and general counsel for the Corporation Service Company from 1998 to 2002 in Wilmington, Delaware. Jordan currently teaches as an adjunct professor for the University of Pennsylvania Law School, Vanderbilt University Law School, and Widener University School of Law.

Federal judicial service 

Jordan was nominated to a vacancy on the United States District Court for the District of Delaware by President George W. Bush on July 25, 2002, and confirmed by the United States Senate on November 14, 2002, by voice vote. He received his commission on November 15, 2002. His service as a district court judge was terminated on December 15, 2006 when he was elevated to the United States Court of Appeals for the Third Circuit. 

Four years later, Bush nominated Jordan to the Third Circuit on June 28, 2006, to fill a vacancy left by Judge Jane Richards Roth. He was confirmed to that court by a 91–0 vote on December 8, 2006 during the waning hours of the final lame duck session of the 109th Congress. Jordan was the sixth judge appointed to the Third Circuit by Bush and last Article III judge confirmed by the Republican-controlled 109th Senate. He received his commission on December 13, 2006.

Jordan's first precedential opinion for the Third Circuit was published on May 2, 2007. He authored the opinion for a unanimous three-judge panel in Eichorn v. AT&T II, an ERISA claims case. Judge Roth, whom Jordan was confirmed to replace, was a member of the panel.

References

External links

O'Sullivan, Sean, "Del. lawmakers support Jordan at hearing", Delaware News-Journal, September 7, 2006.
Profile of Jordan prepared by Widener University School of Law
Penn Law Faculty Profile

1957 births
Living people
20th-century Mormon missionaries
21st-century American judges
Latter Day Saints from Delaware
American Mormon missionaries in Japan
Assistant United States Attorneys
Brigham Young University alumni
Georgetown University Law Center alumni
Judges of the United States Court of Appeals for the Third Circuit
Judges of the United States District Court for the District of Delaware
People from West Point, New York
United States court of appeals judges appointed by George W. Bush
United States district court judges appointed by George W. Bush
University of Pennsylvania Law School faculty
Widener University faculty
Vanderbilt University Law School faculty